Robert L. Downing (1857–1944) was an American stage actor who specialized in Shakespeare characterizations. As a young actor he toured with Mary Anderson 1880-1884 and Joseph Jefferson 1884-86. He became a star in his own right in 1886 and afterward performed Shakespearean parts. He was born in Washington D.C. and after retiring from acting in 1908 he became a preacher.

References

External links
alternative start findagrave page on Robert L. Downing
North American Theatre Online: Robert L. Downing
portrait(NY Public Library, Billy Rose)
Robert Downing Papers at the Harry Ransom Center

1857 births
1944 deaths
Male actors from Washington, D.C.
20th-century American male actors
19th-century American male actors
American male stage actors
American male Shakespearean actors